Å is a village in Lavangen Municipality in Troms og Finnmark county, Norway.

The population (2001) of the village was 79.  The southern part of the village area is called Soløy, and that is the location of Lavangen Church.

Name
The village (originally a farm) was first mentioned in 1610 ("Aa"). The name is from Old Norse á, which means "(small) river"

See also
Å, Ibestad in Ibestad municipality, Troms, Norway
Å, Tranøy in Tranøy municipality, Troms, Norway

References

Villages in Troms
Lavangen